Mesa/Boogie (also known as Mesa Engineering) is an American company in Petaluma, California, that manufactures amplifiers and other accessories for guitars and basses. It has been in operation since 1969.

Mesa was started by Randall Smith as a small repair shop which modified Fender amplifiers, particularly the diminutive Fender Princeton. Smith's modifications gave the small amps much more input gain, making them much louder as well as creating a high-gain, distorted guitar tone. Prominent early customers included Carlos Santana and Keith Richards of The Rolling Stones. Exposure from these top players helped to establish Mesa/Boogie's position on the market, and it is frequently referred to as the first manufacturer of boutique amplifiers.

Subsequent design revisions to Mesa's early amps lead to the Mark Series, which popularized modern, high-gain circuits, while the 1990s saw the introduction of Mesa's flagship Rectifier amps, the success of which made the brand a staple of modern rock tone.  In 2021, Mesa/Boogie was acquired by Gibson.

Randall Smith 
Randall Smith was born into a musical family in Berkeley, California in 1946. His mother and sister played piano and his father was the first-chair clarinet with the Oakland Symphony Orchestra, played tenor sax, had a radio show and led a hotel dance band. Smith believes all of his early musical experiences taught him how to hear tone.

As a Boy Scout, Smith became friends with his troop leader's son and they built ham radios together. Smith's father had a friend, Ernie, who built hi-fi turntables and gave him a couple to experiment on until he was 11 or 12.

Smith attended Miramonte High School in Orinda, California, and graduated in 1964. During his freshman year he attended distant University of California, Santa Barbara, as his parents wanted him removed from the counterculture influences of local University of California, Berkeley. However, he would hop freight trains nearly every weekend from Santa Barbara back to the Bay Area to see friends and return to the Beat coffee houses and bookstores of Berkeley. During the next four years he attended UC Berkeley, studying humanities, English Literature and creative writing courses, but never graduated.

Smith wanted to participate in the burgeoning San Francisco music scene, having been taught clarinet and a little sax by his father, but he took up drums, as it was the easiest to learn quickly.  He played with a local blues and jam band and co-founded the band Martha's Laundry.  While playing a gig, keyboardist Dave Kessner's amp failed, and after Smith successfully repaired it, an impressed Kessner proposed opening a music store together with Smith as the repairman.  They opened Prune Music in 1967, inside a building that had been a Chinese grocery store.  Smith's clientele included area bands like the Steve Miller Band, the Grateful Dead, and Jefferson Airplane.

Offshoots of Prune Music continue in Berkeley to this day with Subway Guitars, Sam Cohen (aka Fat Dog) and Guitar Resurrection in Austin, TX with former Martha's Laundry guitarist, Jim Lehman (aka Lizard Slim). They were partners until 1975.

History of Mesa/Boogie

Name 

Mesa/Boogie began with a practical joke when Smith was commissioned to secretly convert the 20-watt Fender Princeton of a local guitarist into a significantly louder 100-watt amp without altering its appearance.  He accomplished this by replacing the amplifier section with that of a Fender Bassman and replacing the 10-inch speaker with a 12-inch speaker.  To ensure the joke would work, Smith asked Carlos Santana, a customer at Prune Music, to demo the amp.  Despite initial skepticism at the sight of the seemingly stock amplifier, Santana played it and was impressed, exclaiming, "Man, that amp really boogies!" 

The "Mesa" name came about through Smith's other job, rebuilding Mercedes engines. Smith decided to set up Mesa Engineering so he could purchase wholesale parts for amps and engines. He needed an official sounding name through which to buy Mercedes parts and building supplies, and chose Mesa Engineering.

The 1970s and the Princeton Boogie 
If hot-rodding Fenders was the first breakthrough, the second was developing an extra gain stage for the guitar input. Smith was building a preamplifier for Lee Michaels, who needed a pre-amp to drive his new Crown DC-300 power amplifiers. Smith added an extra tube gain stage to the preamp, with three variable gain controls at different points in the circuit, in what is now called a "cascaded" design.  The amount of gain produced surprised both men, and Smith combined the cascaded design with the small form factor of the Fender Princeton, creating the first high-gain amp, the "Princeton Boogie."  Released in 1972, the Boogies solved the issue of amps not having enough gain to sustain notes at volumes suitable for smaller venues.  An early customer, Santana took a snakeskin-covered model to a jam session with Bob Dylan and The Rolling Stones at Madison Square Garden.  Joining the Stones onstage for an encore of "Sympathy for the Devil," Santana's guitar tone turned the band into fans of the brand, and the Stones' next tour exclusively featured Boogie amps.  As the demand for his amps grew, Smith decided to move his workshop out of the Prune Music storefront to get away from the distractions of the store having become a busy local hangout. He relocated to what was formerly a plywood dog kennel, then, eventually, to his home.

Smith produced a number of custom variations of the Boogie through the late 1970s, with options including reverb, a five-band graphic EQ, various speakers (most often Altec or Electro-Voice), koa wood jointed cabinets, and wicker grills. Upon the 1978 release of the Boogie's successor - the "Mark II" - the Boogie was renamed the Mark I. Smith ultimately produced over 3000 amps out of his home workshop in the 1970s.

The 1980s and the Mark IIC+ 

As Mesa continued to grow, Smith moved the company to Petaluma in 1980 and continued to improve his amp designs to meet players' requests.  Revisions to the Mark II resulted in amplifier milestones such as channel switching (Mark IIA) and the first effects loop (Mark IIB).  Notably, the Mark IIC was voiced to "sound heavier and more menacing," and the IIC+ variant became popular with early heavy metal guitarists like Metallica's Kirk Hammett and James Hetfield, who was dissatisfied with Marshall amps at the time and wanted something "percussive tight and in your face."  Guitar World cited the IIC+'s use on Master of Puppets as the primary reason for its "holy grail" status in the rock and metal genres, while noting the amp was also a favorite of top session musicians at the time like Steve Lukather.  As the Mark III was already deep in development, fewer then 3,000 IIC+ amps were made during its short production run between January 1984 and March 1985.  Additionally, some players had earlier Mark II models modified to IIC+ specs.  The IIC+ is Mesa/Boogie's most valuable amp on the secondary market, with models often selling for over $15,000, as of 2023.

Throughout the decade, Mesa continued to produce combo and head amplifiers, and began production of rack power and pre-amps, developing power amplifiers such as the M180/190 and Strategy series, as well as pre-amps such as the Quad and Studio.  Other models developed in the 1980s included the Mark III, Mark IV, the Son of Boogie, and the Studio .22.

The 1990s and the Rectifiers 
As the 1980s came to a close, the complicated features and boutique styling of the Mark series began losing popularity in favor of simpler designs by Marshall, Bogner, and Soldano.  Particularly inspired by Soldano's SLO 100 - itself derived from the Mark series circuits - Mesa introduced the Dual Rectifier in 1991.  With a "raw, aggressive bass-heavy sound" and sporting a characteristic steel, diamond faceplate, the Rectifier was Mesa's take on a "big, monster-metal head" and intended to look threatening compared to the Mark amps.

The Rectifier became immensely popular among heavier styles of rock music in the wake of grunge, most notably nu metal, as well as hard rock, post-grunge, and punk.  While an array of bands have used Rectifiers - including Korn, Tool, Soundgarden, Foo Fighters, and Blink 182 - Smith has said the overwhelming success of the amp with its distinctive sound and styling has led many people to associate the entire Mesa brand exclusively with metal, despite the company's roots in the "Fender legacy" and its initial reputation as a "hippie outfit" aimed at blues players.  

Mesa continued to revise the design of the Rectifiers as the decade went on, with "Revisions" F and G having a darker, looser sound that extended the model's popularity into the 2000s.

Mesa followed up the success of the Rectifiers with the short-lived Maverick and Blue Angel models, as well as the Nomads.

The 2000s to present day 
Mesa has continued to introduce new models in the 2000s and 2010s, with models such as the Road King II, the Lone Star and Lone Star Special, the Stiletto and Express lines along with lower watt versions of its large amps, such as the mini Rectifier, and the Mark V:25 and Mark V:35.

On January 6, 2021, it was announced that Gibson had acquired Mesa/Boogie. As a result of the acquisition, then-75-year-old Smith joined Gibson as "Master Designer and Pioneer of Mesa/Boogie and beyond."

Notable users

References

External links

 

Guitar amplifier manufacturers
Petaluma, California
Companies based in Sonoma County, California
Audio equipment manufacturers of the United States
Gibson Brands
Mesa/Boogie